Honorata Marcińczak (17 June 1930 – 30 July 2022) was a Polish gymnast. She competed in seven events at the 1952 Summer Olympics.

References

1930 births
2022 deaths
Polish female artistic gymnasts
Olympic gymnasts of Poland
Gymnasts at the 1952 Summer Olympics
Sportspeople from Kraków